Maple Grove, also known as the Joseph Davis House, is a historic home located at St. Joseph, Missouri.  It was built in 1847, and is a two-story, five bay, "L"-shaped, brick dwelling with Classical style design influences. It has a one-story wing and one-story entrance portico.

It was listed on the National Register of Historic Places in 1974.

References

Houses on the National Register of Historic Places in Missouri
Neoclassical architecture in Missouri
Houses completed in 1847
Houses in St. Joseph, Missouri
National Register of Historic Places in Buchanan County, Missouri